Mary Barrett may refer to:
 Mary Dyer née Barrett (c. 1611–1660), colonial American Quaker martyr
 Mary Ellin Barrett (born 1926), American writer
 Mary Adrian Barrett (1929–2015), American Catholic religious sister
 Mary Hall Barrett Adams (1816–1860), née Barrett, American book editor and letter writer
 Mary Ethel Williams Barrett (1913–1951), artist, art teacher, and the first director of the Wilmington Museum of Art

See also 
 Maria Barrett, American general
 Mario Barrett a.k.a. ''Mario (born 1986), American singer
 Maurie Barrett (1893–1981), Australian rules footballer